Veliki Vrh is a settlement in the Municipality of Šmartno ob Paki in northern Slovenia. It lies in the hills north of Šmartno. The entire area is part of the traditional region of Styria and is now included in the Savinja Statistical Region.

References

External links
Veliki Vrh at Geopedia

Populated places in the Municipality of Šmartno ob Paki